Stanislav Alekseyevich Pozdnyakov (born 27 September 1973) is a Russian former fencer, a five-time Olympian (1992–2008) and five-time Olympic medalist in the sabre competitions. He was also a ten-time world champion, winning in 1994–2007. He currently serves as the president of the Russian Olympic Committee. In June 2022, he was removed from his position as European Fencing Confederation (EFC) President at an Extraordinary Congress following a unanimous vote of no confidence in Pozdnyakov in March 2022, due to his conduct in the wake of the  Russian invasion of Ukraine.

His daughter Sofia Pozdniakova is also a fencer and was gold medalist of the 2020 Tokyo Olympics Women's Individual Sabre event.

Career
Pozdnyakov won the World Fencing Championships ten times; five times in the team event and five times in the individual event. He also won five silver and two bronze medals at the World Championships.

Pozdnyakov is one of the most successful Olympic fencers. At the 1992 Summer Olympics in Barcelona, Spain, as a member of the Unified Team, he took gold. In 1996, now as team captain and competing for Russia, he again won gold in the team event and added his third gold by triumphing in the individual event. His third Olympics was in 2000, where he won his third consecutive team gold and fourth overall. At the 2004 Olympics, Pozdnyakov again competed as part of the Russian men's sabre team, beating the USA 45-44 for the bronze medal. Four years later, at his fifth and last Olympics in 2008, Pozdnyakov finished without a medal as Russia lost in the semi-finals to the USA 45–44 and then lost its bronze medal game. He retired after the Games in Beijing.

After retiring from competitive fencing Pozdnyakov served as an official of the International Fencing Federation (FIE).

Since May 2018 Pozdnyakov serves as the President of the Russian Olympic Committee.

In June 2022, he was removed from his position as European Fencing Confederation (EFC) President at an Extraordinary Congress following a unanimous vote of no confidence in Pozdnyakov in March 2022, due to his xenophobic conduct in the wake of the  Russian invasion of Ukraine.

See also
Multiple medallist at the World Fencing Championships

References

External links
 
 
 

1973 births
Living people
Russian male sabre fencers
Fencers at the 1992 Summer Olympics
Fencers at the 1996 Summer Olympics
Fencers at the 2000 Summer Olympics
Fencers at the 2004 Summer Olympics
Fencers at the 2008 Summer Olympics
Olympic fencers of the Unified Team
Olympic fencers of Russia
Olympic gold medalists for the Unified Team
Olympic gold medalists for Russia
Olympic bronze medalists for Russia
Sportspeople from Novosibirsk
Olympic medalists in fencing
Medalists at the 1992 Summer Olympics
Medalists at the 1996 Summer Olympics
Medalists at the 2000 Summer Olympics
Medalists at the 2004 Summer Olympics
Universiade medalists in fencing
Universiade gold medalists for Russia
Medalists at the 1995 Summer Universiade
Medalists at the 1999 Summer Universiade
Presidents of the Russian Olympic Committee
21st-century Russian people